Porter Medical Center, also known as Porter Hospital, is a 45-bed critical access hospital located in Middlebury, Vermont. Founded by banker William Henry Porter to serve as a dual community hospital and infirmary to nearby Middlebury College, the hospital was dedicated on June 15, 1925. In April 2017, the independent hospital joined the University of Vermont Health Network in an attempt to stabilize Porter's financial situation.

References

External links

Hospital buildings completed in 1925
Buildings and structures in Middlebury, Vermont
Hospitals in Vermont
1925 establishments in Vermont